Simon Preston (born 25 February 1967 from Middlewich, Cheshire) is an English professional darts player currently playing in the Professional Darts Corporation.

Career
He won a PDC Tour Card at Q-School in 2016.

Preston made his debut on the 2019 UK Open who beating Terry Temple of England and losing to Arron Monk of England.

References

External links
Profile and Stats on Darts Database

1967 births
Professional Darts Corporation former tour card holders
English darts players
Living people
People from Cheshire